Ewan Bange (born 15 December 2001) is a professional footballer who plays as a striker for Radcliffe FC

Career

Blackpool
Having made his debut for Blackpool's youth team in 2017, Bange's first involvement with the first team was as an unused substitute in a 0–0 League One draw away at Bolton Wanderers. He made his first-team debut on 15 October 2019, coming on as a second-half substitute in a 2–1 EFL Trophy defeat away at Carlisle United.

Bange signed a professional contract with Blackpool on 23 December 2020.

Bamber Bridge
On 13 August 2021, Bange joined for Bamber Bridge on loan.  He scored eleven goals in all competitions.

AFC Telford
In November 2021, upon expiration of his Bamber Bridge loan, Bange joined AFC Telford United, also on loan, until January 2022. He returned to Blackpool on 13 January.

FC United of Manchester
In January 2022 he went out on loan for the third time in the season, this time to F.C. United of Manchester.

Queen of the South (Loan spell)
On 1 September 2022, Bange signed a four-month loan deal for Scottish League One club Queen of the South, after being recommended by Stephen Dobbie, who is the current Senior Professional Development Phase Coach at the Seasiders. 

Radcliffe FC

on 31st January Bange signed for Radcliffe FC.

Career statistics

References

External links
 
 
 

Living people
2001 births
English footballers
Association football forwards
Blackpool F.C. players
Bamber Bridge F.C. players
AFC Telford United players
F.C. United of Manchester players
Queen of the South F.C. players
National League (English football) players
Northern Premier League players